Alfred Billings Street (December 18, 1811 – June 2, 1881) was an American author and poet.

Biography
Street was born in Poughkeepsie (city), New York. His family moved to Monticello in Sullivan County when he was young, and he was educated at the Dutchess county academy. He studied law with his father, Randall S. Street, and practiced in Monticello. In 1839 he moved to Albany and edited the Northern Light from 1843 to 1844. He wrote poetry that was published in literary magazines.  In 1848 he was appointed New York State Librarian, a position he held until his death. His poems deal with the sights and sounds of the woodland and the life of the more primitive days of the settlement of America.

List of works
Among his books of verse are:  
 The Burning of Schenectady, and Other Poems (1842)
 Drawings and Tintings (1844)
 Fugitive Poems (1846)
 Frontenac: or The Atotarho of the Iroquois (1849)

His chief prose works are:  
 Woods and Waters, or the Saranacs and the Racket (1860)
 The Indian Pass (1869)
 Lake and Mountain; or, Autumn in the Adirondacks (1870)
 Eagle Pine; or, Sketches of a New York Frontier Village (1871)

He also wrote A Digest of Taxation in the United States (1863). 
His words were used for the song Our Own Robbie Burns by Henry Tucker.

References

External links
 Quotes by Alfred Billings Street
Works by Alfred Billings Street at Project Gutenberg
 

Writers from Poughkeepsie, New York
19th-century American poets
American male poets
Street, Street, Alfred Billings
Street, Alfred Billingd
1881 deaths
19th-century American male writers
American male non-fiction writers
Historians from New York (state)